Alasdair James Allan (born 6 May 1971) is a Scottish politician serving as the Member of the Scottish Parliament (MSP) for the Na h-Eileanan an Iar constituency since 2007. A member of the Scottish National Party (SNP), he served as a Scottish Government from 2011 to 2018, first as Minister for Learning, Science and Scotland's Languages and then Minister for International Development and Europe.

Early life 
Alasdair James Allan was born on 6 May 1971 in Ashkirk to Christine and John H. Allan. Allan graduated from the University of Glasgow with an MA in Scottish Language and Literature, continuing his studies at the University of Aberdeen, graduating with a PhD in Scots language in 1998.

He devoted his time and employment to the Scottish National Party in Peterhead, working for Alex Salmond, the former First Minister of Scotland, and he subsequently became assistant to Michael Russell. Previous to becoming an MSP, Alasdair was senior media relations officer for the Church of Scotland.

He is quadrilingual, and is able to speak: Scottish Gaelic, Norwegian, Scots and English.

Political career
Allan was the SNP candidate for Gordon at the 2003 Scottish Parliament election. As National Secretary of the SNP, he was responsible in July 2004 for the expulsion of Campbell Martin from the party after Martin had claimed that there was a case for supporters of independence not voting SNP.

Allan was next in line to become a list MSP for North East Scotland when Richard Lochhead resigned to fight the Moray by-election, however he decided instead to devote himself to contesting Na h-Eileanan an Iar, a key Labour–SNP marginal seat in the 2007 Scottish Parliament election. He relocated to Lewis and resigned his post as SNP National Secretary. This move proved successful, as he was elected with 46.6% of the vote – a 5.4% swing from Labour.

In the 2011 Scottish Parliament election Allan again stood for the SNP in the now renamed seat of Na h-Eileanan an Iar and increased his majority, returning to Holyrood with 65.3% of the vote, an increase of 18.7% and a swing of 15.8% from Labour.

As of July 2020, Allan is a member of the Committee on the Scottish Government Handling of Harassment Complaints, the Education and Skills Committee and the Justice Committee of the Scottish Parliament.

He is a speaker and strong supporter of Scottish Gaelic and Scots and holds a PhD on the latter. He authored the booklet Talking Independence, which sought to answer questions about Scottish independence, ranging from "What will I pay in tax?" to "Will I still be able to visit relatives in England?" and "Will we still get EastEnders?".

Allan voted against same-sex marriage in Scotland, saying "the view which so many of my constituents have expressed to me has a right to be recorded" – in contrast to the position of the majority of the SNP government.

Allan wrote a book, Tweed Rins tae the Ocean, in response to claims made by former Conservative MP Rory Stewart that the Anglo-Scottish border was unnatural. Allan walked the Border and recorded his travels, similar to what Stewart did for his book The Marches.

See also
Government of the 3rd Scottish Parliament
Government of the 4th Scottish Parliament

References

External links 
 
 Alasdair Allan's website
 Profile on SNP website

1971 births
Living people
People from the Scottish Borders
Alumni of the University of Aberdeen
Alumni of the University of Glasgow
Scottish political writers
Scottish National Party MSPs
Ministers of the Scottish Government
Members of the Scottish Parliament 2007–2011
Members of the Scottish Parliament 2011–2016
Members of the Scottish Parliament 2016–2021
Members of the Scottish Parliament 2021–2026